Athletics was contested at the 2013 Summer Universiade from July 7 to 12 at the Universiade Village Stadium and the Central Stadium in Kazan, Russia.

Level of participation and performance was moderate. The proximity of other important athletics competitions like Asian Championships, South American Championships, Central American and Caribbean Championships and European U23 Championships caused many high-profile student-athletes to skip the event. The host nation, Russia, however, fielded most of its top athletes which resulted in three Universiade records and first place on the medal table with a huge lead over the second nation, Ukraine.

Medal summary
In 18 May 2017, the rankings of the Women’s Heptathlon and 1,500m were updated further to the suspension of two Russian female athletes by the Court of Arbitration for Sport (CAS).

On 13 November 2020, the rankings of the Women’s 3000m steeplechase were updated further to the suspension of two Russians, one Ukrainian and one Turkish female athletes by the Court of Arbitration for Sport (CAS).

On 12 August 2022, the results of Russian Irina Tarasova between July 2012 and July 2016 were annulled by the Athletics Integrity Unit for doping violation. This means that her gold medal in the women's shot put has been stripped.

Men's events

Women's events

Medal table

Participating nations

 (2)
 (1)
 (1)
 (1)
 (2)
 (19)
 (3)
 (2)
 (2)
 (2)
 (8)
 (6)
 (4)
 (12)
 (5)
 (2)
 (2)
 (51)
 (2)
 (2)
 (10)
 (24)
 (8)
 (7)
 (1)
 (3)
 (1)
 (14)
 (2)
 (5)
 (1)
 (2)
 (5)
 (25)
 (2)
 (2)
 (14)
 (15)
 (16)
 (3)
 (1)
 (1)
 (3)
 (6)
 (16)
 (4)
 (1)
 (9)
 (6)
 (12)
 (2)
 (8)
 (30)
 (16)
 (4)
 (3)
 (18)
 (3)
 (1)
 (21)
 (4)
 (6)
 (7)
 (3)
 (3)
 (15)
 (5)
 (4)
 (6)
 (3)
 (8)
 (2)
 (18)
 (6)
 (7)
 (1)
 (1)
 (21)
 (6)
 (2)
 (2)
 (1)
 (16)
 (98)
 (1)
 (1)
 (7)
 (1)
 (4)
 (7)
 (8)
 (1)
 (26)
 (7)
 (7)
 (15)
 (2)
 (13)
 (11)
 (8)
 (2)
 (10)
 (1)
 (2)
 (26)
 (2)
 (14)
 (21)
 (2)
 (15)
 (6)
 (1)
 (2)
 (2)
 (6)

References

External links
2013 Summer Universiade – Athletics
Official results book

 
Universiade
2013 Summer Universiade events
Athletics at the Summer Universiade
International athletics competitions hosted by Russia